Sofia Grönberg-Whitmore (born 25 May 1965) is a Swedish professional golfer. She played on the Ladies European Tour (LET) between 1989 and 2001 and won three LET titles. In 1989 she also won a title on the Ladies Asian Golf Tour and its Order of Merit.

Alongside Helen Alfredsson and Liselotte Neumann, Grönberg-Whitmore was one of the pioneers of women's professional golf in Sweden in the 1980s.

Amateur career
She spent two years with the golf team at the University of Alabama and later married Englishman John Whitmore, residing in Warwickshire for part of her career.

As an amateur, she was part of the Swedish teams winning the 1984 European Lady Junior's Team Championship and the 1987 European Ladies' Team Championship. She played in the 1986 Espirito Santo Trophy in Caracas, Venezuela with Helen Alfredsson and Eva Dahllöf. In 1987 she played for Europe in the Vagliano Trophy.

Professional career
Grönberg-Whitmore turned professional in 1988 and joined the Ladies European Tour. She won the 1988 IBM Ladies Open, a Swedish Golf Tour event that was added to the LET schedule two years later.

In early 1989, Grönberg-Whitmore played on the Ladies Asian Golf Tour, where she won the Indonesia Ladies Open and that season's Order of Merit. Back in Europe, she won the LET season opener, the Rome Classic, in April. At the end of the year, she was named Swedish Golfer of the Year.

Over the next decade, her best results were runner-up finishes at the La Manga Spanish Open and the Sens Ladies' Dutch Open, both in 1994. She returned to her winning ways in 1999. After triumphing both in the Air France Madame Biarritz Open and the inaugural Cantor Fitzgerald Laura Davies Invitational at Brocket Hall, she moved to fifth place on the LET Order of Merit and sixth spot on the European Solheim Cup ranking.

Professional wins (8)

Ladies European Tour (3)

Ladies Asian Golf Tour (1)
1989 Indonesia Ladies Open

Swedish Golf Tour (1)

Other (3)
2005 Prins Bertils Pokal
2007 Prins Bertils Pokal
2010 Prins Bertils Pokal

Team appearances
Amateur
European Lady Junior's Team Championship (representing Sweden): 1984 (winners), 1986
European Ladies' Team Championship (representing Sweden): 1985, 1987 (winners)
Espirito Santo Trophy (representing Sweden): 1986
Vagliano Trophy (representing the Continent of Europe): 1987
Professional
Praia d'El Rey European Cup (representing Ladies European Tour): 1999 (winners)

Source:

References

External links

Swedish female golfers
Alabama Crimson Tide women's golfers
Ladies European Tour golfers
Sportspeople from Västra Götaland County
People from Falköping Municipality
1965 births
Living people